Peter James Martin (born 15 November 1968) is a former English cricketer who played in 8 Tests and 20 ODIs for England from 1995 to 1998. Nicknamed "Digger", Martin was primarily a fast-medium swing bowler. In county cricket, he played for Lancashire throughout his career.

Domestic career
As a batsman, Martin was capable of contributing runs from the lower order, and was competent enough to record two first-class centuries for Lancashire. By a statistical anomaly Martin topped the List A batting averages in 1996. He scored 78 runs in 12 innings, but was not out in 11 of these, so giving him a season's average of 78.00 despite a top score of just 35*. He continued to play for Lancashire until his retirement from cricket in 2004.

International career
In 1995, he was called up to the England squad for their ODI series against West Indies, and he claimed figures of 4/44 on his debut. His success in that series earned him a place on the Test team to play the West Indies that year. He was named in the touring party for the England tour to South Africa later that year, and was also part of the England squad for the 1996 Cricket World Cup.

After 1996, he did not play many more matches for England with his last appearance coming in the 1998 ICC Knock Out tournament.

References

External links
Cricinfo page on Peter Martin

1968 births
Living people
Lancashire cricketers
English cricketers
England One Day International cricketers
Cricketers at the 1996 Cricket World Cup
England Test cricketers
People from Accrington